Robert Tourtelot is a Los Angeles lawyer and former chairman of the California Horse Racing Board, the commission that regulates the California horse racing industry.

Tourtelot was first appointed to the CHRB by the Governor of California in October 1993, and was reappointed to the Board by Governor Pete Wilson in July 2001. He became acting Chairman of the Board when former Chairman George Nicholaw’s term on the Board expired in February 2000, and was unanimously elected CHRB Board Chairman in March 2000.

Tourtelot is a graduate of University of California, Hastings College of the Law. He is a principal in the law firm of Robert H. Tourtelot, PLC, which is a Los Angeles law firm specializing in litigation and transactional projects. Tourtelot was a member of the board of directors of DARE America and of the Los Angeles Police Department Crime Prevention Advisory Council. He is a special reserve officer for the LAPD. He also holds a commercial helicopter pilot license. Tourtelot resides in Los Angeles with his wife, Susan. He has one son, Robert Jr., and three daughters, Adrienne, Nicole, and Katherine.

References

Living people
University of California, Hastings College of the Law alumni
Year of birth missing (living people)